The 15 cm SK L/45 was a German naval gun used in World War I and World War II.

Naval service
The 15 cm SK L/45 was a widely used naval gun on many classes of World War I dreadnoughts and cruisers in both casemates and turrets.  It was constructed of an A tube and two layers of hoops with a Krupp horizontal sliding-wedge breech block.  During World War I a few pre-war cruisers that were armed with 10.5 cm guns were rearmed with these weapons. In World War II the 15 cm SK L/45 was widely used as coastal artillery and as primary armament on German auxiliary cruisers.

Ship classes that carried the 15 cm SK L/45 include:

Ammunition
Ammunition was of separate loading quick fire type.

The gun was able to fire:
 Armor piercing 
 High explosive base fuzed 
 High explosive nose fuzed 
 Common shell

Coast defense gun 

The same gun was used for coast defense duties in concrete emplacements after World War I. One example was 3./Marine-Artillerie Abteilung 604 ("3rd Battery of Naval Artillery Battalion 604") in Jersey. They show it using  shells with a range of

Railroad gun 

It was also used as a railroad gun during World War I.

See also

Weapons of comparable role, performance and era
BL 6 inch Mk XII naval gun British equivalent

Footnotes
Notes

Citations

References

External links 

 the 15cm SK L/45 on NavWeaps

Naval guns of Germany
World War I naval weapons
World War II naval weapons
150 mm artillery
Coastal artillery